Harry Monroe "Welch" Welchonce (November 20, 1883 – February 26, 1977) was a Major League Baseball outfielder. In 26 games, Welchonce had 14 hits in 66 at-bats, with a .212 batting average. He batted left and threw right-handed. In 1916, he was the player/manager of the Dallas Giants in the Texas League.

Welchonce was born in North Point, Pennsylvania and died in Arcadia, California.

External links

1883 births
1977 deaths
Baseball players from California
Philadelphia Phillies players
Steubenville Stubs players
South Bend Bronchos players
Nashville Vols players
Atlanta Crackers players
Dallas Giants players